Carl-Johan Alexander Lindqvist (born November 15, 1971 in Tyresö) is a Swedish luger who competed in the early 1990s. Competing in two Winter Olympics, he earned his best finish of sixth in the men's doubles at Albertville in 1992.

As of 2007, Lindqvist is the director of information technology for the Swedish Bobsleigh, Luge, and Skeleton Federation.

References
1992 luge men's doubles results
1994 luge men's doubles results
Swedish bobsleigh, luge, and skeleton federation executive committee featuring Lindqvist

External links
 

1971 births
Living people
People from Tyresö Municipality
Lugers at the 1992 Winter Olympics
Lugers at the 1994 Winter Olympics
Swedish male lugers
Olympic lugers of Sweden
Sportspeople from Stockholm County